Manuel Ferrini (born 25 June 1998) is an Italian professional footballer who plays as a centre back for  club Messina on loan from Renate.

Club career
Born in Rimini, Ferrini finished his youth career in Sassuolo, then he joined Serie C club Sicula Leonzio.

In 2020, he signed for Gubbio.

On 6 July 2021, he joined Serie C club Renate. On 27 January 2022, he moved to Vis Pesaro on loan with an option to buy. On 1 September 2022, Ferrini was loaned by Messina.

References

External links
 
 

1998 births
Living people
Sportspeople from Rimini
Footballers from Emilia-Romagna
Italian footballers
Association football defenders
Serie C players
A.S.D. Sicula Leonzio players
A.S. Gubbio 1910 players
A.C. Renate players
Vis Pesaro dal 1898 players
A.C.R. Messina players